Carole Grundisch (born 7 September 1986) is a French table tennis player. Her highest career ITTF ranking was 68.

References

1986 births
Living people
French female table tennis players
People from Saint-Mandé
20th-century French women
21st-century French women